Governor Bullock may refer to:

Alexander Bullock (1816–1882), 26th Governor of Massachusetts
George Bullock (British Army officer) (1851–1926), Governor of Bermuda from 1912 to 1917
Rufus Bullock (1834–1907), 46th Governor of Georgia
Steve Bullock (American politician) (born 1966), 24th Governor of Montana

See also
Archibald Bulloch (1730–1777), 1st governor of Georgia